Bucephalandra is a genus of flowering plants in the family Araceae. There are 30 species of Bucephalandra which have been discovered in Borneo and have been formally described by S.Y. Wong and P.C. Boyce. Most of the species are found in Borneo. Bucephalandra are usually found growing as dense mats over stones or rocks in streams or rivers in moist tropical forest.

Etymology 
Bucephalandra is derived from Greek words, βοῦς  (bous; bull or cow), κεφαλή (kephalē; head) and ἀνήρ (anēr; man), referring to the shape of the single male (staminate) flowers.

Description 
These rheophytic (very seldom facultative) herbs can be minute to rather large, about 2 cm to 60 cm tall. Their stems are creeping and rooting, with a few or many leaves. The leaves can be quite delicate or tough and their shapes can be elliptic, oblong, linear, oblanceolate or obovate. Most of the leaf surfaces are rather glossy and the colours of the leaf range from dark blue-green to green, often with white to yellow to red tinges or spots on the back of the leaves. Inflorescence can be solitary or in pair to several. Spathes are mostly white with flush (a few of them are yellow) and shapes can be ellipsoid to lanceolate, narrowing to a point. The limbs (upper part of spathes) drop off during staminate anthesis, leaving the persistent funnel-shaped lower part of the spathe.  Spadix consist of a few or no pistillodes at the base, pistillate zone, a few rows of scale-like motile staminodes (interstice staminodes), staminate zone, and appendix. Pistils are depressed globose or depressed trapezoidal in shape, 1-locular and with many ovules. Stamens consist of short filaments with thecae at the tip, dehiscing by a pore. Pollens squeezed out from the theca pore like a droplet. Fruits are berries with round to ellipsoidal shapes.

Anthesis and role of interstice staminodes 
The scale-like motile staminodes sandwiched by pistillate and staminate flower zones are called interstice staminodes. These staminodes play a role in controlling pollinators' access to the pistillate flower zone and to protect the developing fruits.

During pistillate anthesis, the spathe inflates to create a slit in the limb, stigmas become sticky and emit odour to attract pollinatros, and the interstice staminodes and thecae erect, allowing pollinators to access pistillate zone. When stigmas become non-receptive, the interstice staminodes begin to lower and seal off the lower spathe.

During staminate athesis, the staminate flower thecae point upward and emit odour. Shortly after that, the limb splits away from the lower spathe, coincidentally pollen droplet extrudes from the tips of the theca horns.

Once the fertilization is successful, the interstice staminodes become photosynthetic, thicken, and harden until the fruits are fully developed. The enlarged berries push the staminodes up and staminodes shed away. The fruits are exposed and quickly become gooey pulp embedded with seeds.

Seed dispersal of Bucephalandra 
The seeds of Bucephalandra are dispersed by splash-cup mechanism; water droplets splash into the funnel-shape lower spathe and this motion ejects the seeds. The seeds will then anchor on the mosses or tiny fissures on the surrounding rock.

Species 

Bucephalandra akantha S.Y. Wong & P. C. Boyce
Bucephalandra aurantiitheca S.Y. Wong & P. C. Boyce
Bucephalandra belindae S.Y. Wong & P. C. Boyce
Bucephalandra bogneri S.Y. Wong & P. C. Boyce
Bucephalandra catherineae P. C. Boyce, Bogner & Mayo
Bucephalandra chimaera S.Y. Wong & P. C. Boyce
Bucephalandra chrysokoupa S.Y. Wong & P. C. Boyce
Bucephalandra diabolica S.Y. Wong & P. C. Boyce
Bucephalandra elliptica S.Y. Wong & P. C. Boyce
Bucephalandra filiformis S.Y. Wong & P. C. Boyce
Bucephalandra forcipula S.Y. Wong & P. C. Boyce
Bucephalandra gigantea Bogner
Bucephalandra goliath S.Y. Wong & P. C. Boyce
Bucephalandra kerangas S.Y. Wong & P. C. Boyce
Bucephalandra kishii S.Y. Wong & P. C. Boyce
Bucephalandra magnifolia H. Okada & Y. Mori
Bucephalandra micrantha S.Y. Wong & P. C. Boyce
Bucephalandra minotaur S.Y. Wong & P. C. Boyce
Bucephalandra motleyana Schott
Bucephalandra muluensis (M. Hotta) S.Y. Wong & P. C. Boyce
Bucephalandra oblanceolata (M. Hotta) S.Y. Wong & P. C. Boyce
Bucephalandra oncophora S.Y. Wong & P. C. Boyce
Bucephalandra pubes S.Y. Wong & P. C. Boyce
Bucephalandra pygmaea (Becc.) P. C. Boyce & S.Y. Wong
Bucephalandra sordidula S.Y. Wong & P. C. Boyce
Bucephalandra spathulifolia Engl. ex S.Y. Wong & P. C. Boyce
Bucephalandra tetana S.Y. Wong & P. C. Boyce
Bucephalandra ultramafica S.Y. Wong & P. C. Boyce
Bucephalandra vespula S.Y. Wong & P. C. Boyce
Bucephalandra yengiae S.Y. Wong & P. C. Boyce
Bucephalandra danumensis S.Y. Wong & P. C. Boyce

References

Aroideae
Araceae genera
Endemic flora of Borneo